Voltage AC is the debut solo album by Puerto Rican reggaeton artist Voltio. It was released in 2004 through record label Sony BMG. The album sold more than 200,000 copies to date, including 50,000 in Japan.

Track listing
 Intro
 Julito Maraña (feat. Tego Calderón)
 Maleante de Cartón
 Cocorota
 Pa' Guayarte Ese Mini (feat. John Eric)
 Voltio
 Locked-Up (Remix) (feat. Akon)
 Mambo 
 Esto Es De Nosotros (feat. Maestro)
 No Amarres Fuego (feat. Zion & Lennox)
 Se Van (feat. Tego Calderón)
 Bumper (produced by Luny Tunes)
 Voltio (Remix) (feat. Maestro)
 No Meten Feca
 Cáscara
 Achero Pa' Un Palo (feat. Sonora Ponceña)

References

Julio Voltio albums
2004 albums
Albums produced by Luny Tunes